The Great Awakening is the fourth studio album from the Christian rock band Leeland, released on September 20, 2011. The Great Awakening received a nomination to the 54th Grammy Awards for Best Contemporary Christian Music Album.

Track listing

Singles
"The Great Awakening"
"I Wonder"
"Pages"

References

2011 albums
Leeland (band) albums